Karl Sims (born 1962) is a computer graphics artist and researcher, who is best known for using particle systems and artificial life in computer animation.

Biography
Sims received a B.S. from MIT in 1984, and a M.S. from the MIT Media Lab in 1987.  He has worked for supercomputer manufacturer and artificial intelligence company Thinking Machines as an artist-in-residence, for Whitney/Demos Productions as a researcher, and co-founded Optomystic. Sims was the founder and CEO of GenArts, a Cambridge, Massachusetts company that developed special effects plugins used in film and video production. In 2008 he moved to a role on the board of directors when Insight Partners acquired a majority stake in the company.

At Optomystic, Sims developed software for the Connection Machine 2 (CM-2) that animated the water from drawings of a deluge by Leonardo da Vinci, used in Mark Whitney's film Excerpts from Leonardo's Deluge.

Sims' animations Particle Dreams and Panspermia used the CM-2 to animate and render various complex phenomena via particle systems. Panspermia was also used as the video for Pantera's 1994 cover of Black Sabbath's "Planet Caravan".

Sims wrote landmark papers on virtual creatures and artificial evolution for computer art. His virtual creatures used an artificial neural network to process input from virtual sensors and act on virtual muscles between cuboid 'limbs'. The creatures were evolved to display multiple modes of water and land based movements such as swimming like a sea snake or fish, jumping and tumbling (walking was not achieved). The creatures were also co-evolved in different species to compete for possession of a virtual cube, displaying the red queen effect. The cover of Artificial Life: An Overview by Chris Langton notably used an image of the creatures generated by Sims.  In 1997, Sims created the interactive installation Galápagos for the NTT InterCommunication Center in Tokyo; in this installation, viewers help evolve 3D animated creatures by selecting which ones will be allowed to live and produce new, mutated offspring.

His paper "Artificial Evolution for Computer Graphics" described the application of genetic algorithms to generate abstract 2D images from complex mathematical formulae, evolved under the guidance of a human.  He used this method to create the video Primordial Dance – which, according to one published study with supplementary video, calls to mind the history of early 20th century abstraction among its several evolutionary themes – as well as parts of Liquid Selves.  Genetic Images was an interactive installation also based on this method; it was exhibited at the Centre Georges Pompidou in Paris, 1993, as well as Ars Electronica and the Los Angeles Interactive Media Festival.

Sims received an Emmy Award in 2019 for outstanding achievement in engineering development. In 1998, he was awarded a MacArthur Fellowship. He has won two Golden Nicas at Prix Ars Electronica, in 1991 and in 1992.  He has also received honors from Imagina, the National Computer Graphics Association, the Berlin Video Festival, NICOGRAPH, Images du Futur, and other festivals.

Filmography
 Flow exhibit demonstration, 2020
 Seven Experiments in Procedural Animation, 2018
 Evolved Virtual Creatures, 1994
 Liquid Selves, 1992
 Primordial Dance, 1991
 Panspermia, 1990 (Incorporated into Beyond the Mind's Eye, 1992) )
 Particle Dreams, 1988
 Excerpts from Leonardo's Deluge, 1989 – software developer

Publications

See also
Artificial life
Evolved virtual creatures
Evolutionary robotics

References

External links
 Karl Sims home page
 Virtual creatures pictures & movies
 Thomas Dreher: History of Computer Art Chap. IV.3.2: Evolutionary Art of William Latham and Karl Sims

American digital artists
Artificial intelligence art
Computer graphics professionals
Computer graphics researchers
Living people
MacArthur Fellows
Researchers of artificial life
1962 births